Manuel Mariscal Zabala (born 23 January 1992) is a Spanish politician and journalist.

Biography
Zabala studied journalism followed by a Master's degree in communication at the Complutense University of Madrid. After graduating he joined ABC newspaper as a trainee reporter. He was a member of the People's Party and worked as a campaign assistant and social media coordinator for the Mayor of Madrid Esperanza Aguirre.

He joined Vox and stood as a candidate for the Spanish general election in May 2019 in which he was elected to the Congress of Deputies for the Toledo constituency. He was re-elected in November 2019.

References 

1992 births
Living people
Members of the 13th Congress of Deputies (Spain)
Members of the 14th Congress of Deputies (Spain)
Vox (political party) politicians
Spanish journalists
People's Party (Spain) politicians
Complutense University of Madrid alumni
Politicians from Castilla–La Mancha